Kiwi! is a 2006 computer-generated animation created by Dony Permedi, a student in the New York City School of Visual Arts, as his Master's Thesis Animation, with music composed and performed by Tim Cassell. The animation's story of a kiwi that aspires to fly created a major Internet phenomenon after it was hosted on the video sharing site YouTube.  Unofficial versions of the video pair it with Mad World by Gary Jules.  These versions became popular viral videos.

Plot
The video itself centers around a kiwi bird who is mysteriously seen to be nailing an array of trees to the side of a sheer cliff so that they stick out horizontally. After the kiwi finishes it returns to the top of the cliff, before donning an aviator's cap and suddenly jumping off. As it dives down the cliff head-first the camera view turns sideways, revealing the purpose behind the kiwi's efforts. A tear wells from one eye as the kiwi achieves its dream, flapping its tiny wings as it "flies" above the forest of trees. The ultimate fate of the kiwi is not explicitly shown (though the sound of a crash can be heard at the end of the video).

Reception
Kiwi! has received a large following for its deep meaning and heart touching manner. One of the most popular activities in the fan base is to create an alternate ending (usually one where the kiwi survives). , the animation has been viewed over 44 million times. It won official recognition on March 26, 2007, when viewers voted it the Most Adorable video of 2006 in the first annual YouTube Video Awards. This was an event large enough to draw international media attention with ABC News describing Kiwi! as "so cute it hurts" while the International Herald Tribune, critical of the awards, characterized the video as being "sweet but dull."

See also 
 Gagarin (Ger.) - cartoon about a caterpillar who dreams of flying.

References

External links
Kiwi! video on YouTube
Dony Permedi's website
Dony Permedi interviewed
Kazakhstani YouTube-like project named after this animation (Archived)
 

2006 independent films
2006 short films
2006 films
2006 YouTube videos
American aviation films
American computer-animated films
Fictional kiwi
American student films
Animated films without speech
2000s American films